Nagle is a surname. 

Notable people with this surname include:

 Angela Nagle (born 1971), Irish non-fiction writer and academic 
 Browning Nagle (born 1968), American football quarterback
 Courtney Nagle (born 1982) American tennis player
 David R. Nagle (born 1943), member of the US House of Representatives
 Don Nagle (1938–1999), American karate grand master
 Florence Nagle (1894–1988), British feminist, racehorse trainer and dog breeder
 Gary Nagle (born 1974/1975), South African business executive, CEO-designate of Glencore
 Jack Nagle (1917–1991), American college basketball coach
 Jacob Nagle (1761–1841), British sailor
 James Nagle (disambiguation), various people
 John Nagle, author of RFC896, see Nagle's algorithm
 John Nagle (1913–2009), Australian lawyer, soldier and jurist
 Kel Nagle (1920–2015), Australian golfer
 Leda Nagle (born 1951), Brazilian journalist and TV presenter
 Margaret Nagle (born 1969), screenwriter and TV producer
 Mary Kathryn Nagle, Cherokee playwright and lawyer
 Matt Nagle (1979–2007), one of the first people to use a brain-computer interface to restore functionality lost due to paralysis
 Nano Nagle (1718–1784), founder of the Presentation Sisters
 Noel Nagle (born 1945), Irish musician, member of The Wolfe Tones
 Ron Nagle (born 1939), American ceramic sculptor
 William Nagle (author) (1947–2002), Australian soldier and author
 William Nagle (American football), American head football coach at Boston College in 1894

Fictional
 Mackey Nagle, a recurring character on Smart Guy

See also
Nagl, a surname
Nagel (surname)